Mara Bizzotto (Bassano del Grappa, 3 June 1972) is an Italian politician and was a European Parliament member.

She was a member of the Regional Council of Veneto from 2000 to 2005 and then, again, from 2006 to 2009, when she was elected to the European Parliament. She was re-elected in 2014 and 2019. Bizzotto was elected a League senator for Veneto after the 2022 general election.

References

External links
 

1972 births
Living people
Venetist politicians
Lega Nord MEPs
MEPs for Italy 2009–2014
MEPs for Italy 2014–2019
MEPs for Italy 2019–2024
21st-century women MEPs for Italy
People from the Province of Vicenza
Members of the Regional Council of Veneto
Senators of Legislature XIX of Italy
Women members of the Senate of the Republic (Italy)
20th-century Italian women politicians